Ian MacDonald (born Ulva Pippy, June 28, 1914 – April 11, 1978) was an American actor and producer during the 1940s and 1950s. He is perhaps best known as villain Frank Miller in High Noon (1952).

Early years 
MacDonald was the son of Rev. William Pippy and Sarah MacDonald Pippy. He attended schools in Helena, Montana, and developed an interest in acting while he was a student at Helena High School. He continued acting at Intermountain College in Helena, from which he graduated in 1934.

He taught school for two years in Marysville before he moved to Hollywood, after which he washed dishes at a YMCA and studied drama at the Pasadena Community Playhouse.

Military service 
MacDonald served in the U.S. Army Signal Corps during World War II. He entered on July 13, 1942, and was discharged on April 15, 1946, reaching the rank of captain.

Career
McDonald played the uncredited colonel in the movie Battleground (1949) who delivered the "Nuts" reply to the German officers demanding that the American forces surrender.

Personal life 
On June 17, 1967, in Santa Monica, California, MacDonald married Shirley Kannegaard, a nurse whom he met when he was a patient at Fort Harrison Veterans Hospital. They remained wed until his death.

Death 
On April 11, 1978, MacDonald died at his home in Bozeman, Montana, at age 63.

Selected filmography

 Madame Guillotine (1931) - Jacques
 Stick to Your Guns (1941) - Henchman Elbows
 Secret of the Wastelands (1941) - Hollister
 They Died with Their Boots On (1941) - Soldier (uncredited)
 Swamp Woman (1941) - Det. Lt. Rance
 The Adventures of Martin Eden (1942) - 'Butch' Raglan
 North of the Rockies (1942) - Lazare
 The Strange Woman (1946) - Boat Captain (uncredited)
 Ramrod (1947) - Walt Shipley
 Pursued (1947) - A Callum (uncredited)
 Deep Valley (1947) - Blast Foreman (uncredited)
 Dark Passage (1947) - Cop in Bus Depot (uncredited)
 My Girl Tisa (1948) - Guard (uncredited)
 The Woman from Tangier (1948) - Paul Moreles
 Mr. Reckless (1948) - Jim Halsey
 Port Said (1948) - Jakoll
 Speed to Spare (1948) - Pusher Wilkes
 Sixteen Fathoms Deep (1948) - Nick
 A Southern Yankee (1948) - Hospital Orderly (uncredited)
 The Man from Colorado (1948) - Jack Rawson (uncredited)
 Road House (1948) - Police Captain
 Song of India (1949) - Prince's Officer (uncredited)
 Joe Palooka in the Big Fight (1949) - Mike
 Streets of San Francisco (1949) - Luke Fraser
 Come to the Stable (1949) - Mr. Matthews (uncredited)
 White Heat (1949) - Bo Creel (uncredited)
 Battleground (1949) - Army Colonel (uncredited)
 Malaya (1949) - Carlos Tassuma
 Montana (1950) - Slim Reeves
 Whirlpool (1950)  - Hogan - Store Detective (uncredited)
 Comanche Territory (1950) - Walshy
 Colt .45 (1950) - Miller
 The Lawless (1950) - Al Peters
 Where the Sidewalk Ends (1950) - Detective Casey (uncredited)
 The Desert Hawk (1950) - Yussef
 Thunder in God's Country (1951) - Smitty
 New Mexico (1951) - Pvt. Daniels
 The Texas Rangers (1951) - The Sundance Kid
 Show Boat (1951) - Drunken Sport (uncredited)
 Ten Tall Men (1951) - Lustig
 The Barefoot Mailman (1951) - Theron Henchman (uncredited)
 This Woman Is Dangerous (1952) - Joe Grossland, Private Eye
 Flaming Feather (1952) - Tombstone Jack
 High Noon (1952) - Frank Miller
 The Brigand (1952) - Maj. Schrock
 The Savage (1952) - Chief Yellow Eagle
 Toughest Man in Arizona (1952) - Steve Girard
 Hiawatha (1952) - Chief Megissogwon
 The Silver Whip (1953) - Hank
 A Perilous Journey (1953) - Sprague
 Blowing Wild (1953) - Jackson
 Taza, Son of Cochise (1954) - Geronimo
 Johnny Guitar (1954) - Pete
 Apache (1954) - Clagg
 The Egyptian (1954) - Ship's Captain (uncredited)
 They Were So Young (1954) - General Rodriguez Garcia (uncredited)
 Timberjack (1955) - Pauquette
 Son of Sinbad (1955) - Murad
 The Lonesome Trail (1955) - Gonaga
 Two-Gun Lady (1955) - Jud Ivers
 Accused of Murder (1956) - Trumbull
 Stagecoach to Fury (1956) - Sheriff Ross
 Duel at Apache Wells (1957) - Marcus Wolf
 Money, Women and Guns (1958) - Nibbs
 Warlock (1959) - MacDonald (uncredited)

References

External links
 

1914 births
1978 deaths
American male film actors
Male actors from Montana
20th-century American male actors
Male Western (genre) film actors
Western (genre) television actors